Kristijan Koren (born 25 November 1986) is a Slovenian professional road racing cyclist. He currently rides for UCI Continental team  where he won 2022 Slovenian National Road Race.He was previously banned from the cycling in 2011-2012 and in 2018

Biography
Born on 25 November 1986, in Postojna, Slovenia, Koren currently resides in Budanje, Slovenia.

He was named in the start list for the 2017 Giro d'Italia.

In 2019, Koren was banned for two years after it was found that he had doped. The discovery was part of Operation Aderlass.

Major results

2006
 National Under-23 Road Championships
1st  Time trial
3rd Road race
 5th Time trial, UEC European Under-23 Road Championships
 10th Time trial, UCI Under-23 Road World Championships
2007
 National Road Championships
1st  Under-23 time trial (absolute best time)
3rd Under-23 road race
 6th Overall Istrian Spring Trophy
 6th La Côte Picarde
 8th Overall The Paths of King Nikola
2008
 1st La Côte Picarde
 Vuelta a Cuba
1st Stages 5 & 15
 2nd Time trial, National Road Championships
 2nd Overall Istrian Spring Trophy
1st Prologue
 3rd Overall Giro delle Regioni
 3rd Tour de Rijke
 UEC European Road Under-23 Championships
6th Road race
10th Time trial
 7th Time trial, UCI Road World Under-23 Championships
 7th Gran Premio della Liberazione
2009
 Giro della Valle d'Aosta
1st Stages 1a (TTT) & 7
 2nd Gran Premio di Poggiana
 3rd Time trial, National Road Championships
 4th Giro del Medio Brenta
 5th Time trial, Mediterranean Games
 5th Overall Giro del Friuli-Venezia Giulia
1st Stage 3
 5th Overall Girobio
1st Stages 8 & 9
 7th Memorial Davide Fardelli
2010
 1st Gran Premio Città di Camaiore
 2nd Time trial, National Road Championships

2011
 3rd Time trial, National Road Championships
 4th Coppa Bernocchi
 6th Overall Tour of Slovenia
2012
 3rd Overall Tour of Slovenia
1st  Points classification
1st Stage 4 (ITT)

2014
 2nd Gran Premio Bruno Beghelli
 4th Overall Tour of Slovenia
 5th RideLondon–Surrey Classic
 6th Gran Premio della Costa Etruschi
 9th Dutch Food Valley Classic
2021
 6th GP Kranj
2022
 1st  Road race, National Road Championships

Grand Tour general classification results timeline

References

External links

Cycling Base: Kristjan Koren
Cycling Quotient: Kristjan Koren

Cannondale-Garmin: Kristjan Koren

1986 births
Living people
Slovenian male cyclists
People from Postojna
Slovenian sportspeople in doping cases
Doping cases in cycling
Competitors at the 2009 Mediterranean Games
Mediterranean Games competitors for Slovenia